Antimo Palano is one of the Italian and international leading experts of hadron spectroscopy.

Biography
After attaining his degree in physics in 1972, he participated to the  WA76-OMEGA experiment at CERN; he was also appointed as spokesman of that experiment. Palano is involved in the  BaBar experiment, at SLAC laboratories,  Stanford University. He is currently Full Professor of Physics at the University of Bari.

In 2003 he discovered a new particle, dubbed Ds0*(2317), unexpected resonance constituted by a charm quark and a strange quark. In the paper in which the discovery of the new particle was reported, there is also an indication about the possible existence of another particle with a mass of about 2460 MeV, the so-called Ds1(2460), subsequently confirmed by the Belle experiment, at the KEK laboratories, in Japan.

References

External links 
 Homepage of the BaBar experiment
 Personal Homepage of Prof. Palano
Educational page of Prof. Palano (in Italian)

Living people
Stanford University faculty
University of Bari alumni
People associated with CERN
Year of birth missing (living people)